According to the Pakistan Environmental Protection Agency's report published on protected areas in 1997, Balochistan has 27 archaeological sites and monuments protected by the Federal Government. These include the province's only national monument; Ziarat Residency. Additionally it has one site on the tentative world heritage list, Mehrgarh.

Of the some 400 sites and monuments protected under the Antiquities Act 1975, the province contains seven sites in Category 1, eight in Category II and fourteen in Category III.

Federal Government
The following sites were previously protected under the Federal Government.

|}

Unprotected sites and heritage

|}

Further reading
 Balochistan Conservation Strategy - IUCN

References

Buildings and structures in Balochistan, Pakistan
Archaeological sites in Pakistan
Archaeological sites in Balochistan, Pakistan